The Bonomi II government of Italy held office from 18 June until 12 December 1944, a total of 177 days, or 5 months and 27 days.

Government parties
The government was composed by the following parties:

Composition

References

 
Italian governments
1944 establishments in Italy
1944 disestablishments in Italy